Averil is a feminine given name. Notable people with the name include:
Everilda or Averil, Anglo-Saxon saint of the 7th century
Averil Beaumont or Margaret Raine Hunt, author
Averil Cameron (born 1940), Professor of Late Antique and Byzantine History
Averil Ives or Ida Pollock, British writer
Averil Leimon, author and executive coach
Averil Margaret Lysaght (1905–1981), New Zealand biologist, science historian and illustrator
Lana Morris or Averil Maureen Anita Morris (1930–1998), British actress
Averil Power (born 1978), Irish Fianna Fáil politician
Professor Averil Mansfield, first female professor of surgery in Britain

See also
Avril Lavigne
English feminine given names